Nicolò Armini (born 7 March 2001) is an Italian professional footballer who plays as a centre-back for  club Potenza on loan from Lazio.

Club career

Lazio
Armini is a youth product of Lazio, whom he joined from Santa Maria delle Mole. Considered one of the club's most promising prospects, he has been compared to Lazio legend Alessandro Nesta. 

On 29 November 2018, Armini made his professional debut in a UEFA Europa League game against Apollon Limassol. He came on as a substitute for Felipe Caicedo as his team lost 2–0. On 20 May 2019, Armini made his first Serie A appearance, coming into play instead of Luiz Felipe, who came off due to an injury, in a match against Bologna which ended in a 3–3 draw.

Piacenza (loan)
On 10 August 2021 he joined Piacenza on loan. He made his debut for the club on 29 August in a Serie C match against Trento which finished 0–0.

Potenza (loan)
On 27 July 2022, Armini was loaned to Potenza in Serie C.

International career
With the Italy U17 team, Armini participated in the 2018 UEFA European Under-17 Championship in England. A starter in central defense throughout the tournament, he took part in all of his team's six games. He even appeared as team captain in the semi-final, which was won over Belgium. Italy eventually lost to the Netherlands in the final after a penalty-shootout. Armini was subsequently included in the UEFA team of the tournament.

With the under-18 team, Armini appeared as captain five times, and scored a goal against Slovenia in August 2018.

With the under-19 team, he participated in the 2019 UEFA European Under-19 Championship in Armenia. He only took part in one match during this competition, against the hosts Armenia, where the Italians won by a large margin of 0–4.

Career statistics

Honours
Lazio
 Coppa Italia: 2018–19
 Supercoppa Italiana: 2017, 2019
Italy U17
 UEFA European Under-17 Championship runner-up: 2018
Individual
UEFA European Under-17 Championship Team of the Tournament: 2018

References

2001 births
Living people
People from Marino, Lazio
Footballers from Lazio
Italian footballers
Association football defenders
Serie A players
Serie C players
S.S. Lazio players
Piacenza Calcio 1919 players
Potenza Calcio players
Italy youth international footballers
Sportspeople from the Metropolitan City of Rome Capital